This is a list of newspapers in Iowa.

Daily newspapers

City/metropolitanThis is a list of daily newspapers currently published in Iowa. For weekly newspapers, see List of newspapers in Iowa.

 Ames Tribune – Ames
 Atlantic News-Telegraph – Atlantic
 Boone News-Republican – Boone
 Carroll Daily Times Herald – Carroll
 Cedar Rapids Defender – Cedar Rapids (currently unavailable)
 Charles City Press – Charles City
 Cherokee Chronicle Times – Cherokee
 Clinton Herald – Clinton
 Council Bluffs Daily Nonpareil – Council Bluffs
 Creston News Advertiser – Creston
 Des Moines Register – Des Moines
 Estherville Daily News – Estherville
 Fort Madison Daily Democrat – Fort Madison
 The Gazette – Cedar Rapids
 Globe Gazette – Mason City
 The Hawk Eye – Burlington
 Iowa City Press-Citizen – Iowa City
 Keokuk Daily Gate City – Keokuk
 Le Mars Daily Sentinel – Le Mars
 Marshalltown Times Republican – Marshalltown
 The Messenger – Fort Dodge
 Mount Pleasant Southeast Iowa Union – Mount Pleasant (was formerly the Fairfield Daily Ledger, Mount Pleasant News and the Washington Evening Journal)
 Muscatine Journal – Muscatine
 Newton Daily News – Newton
 Oelwein Daily Register – Oelwein
 The Oskaloosa Herald – Oskaloosa
 Ottumwa Courier – Ottumwa
 Quad-City Times – Davenport
 Sioux City Journal – Sioux City
 Spencer Daily Reporter – Spencer
 Telegraph Herald – Dubuque
 The Valley News – Shenandoah
 Vinton Cedar Valley Daily Times – Vinton
 The Waterloo-Cedar Falls Courier – Waterloo
 Webster City Daily Freeman-Journal – Webster CityNewspapers published by universities
 The Daily Iowan – Iowa City
 The Grand Views – Des Moines
 Iowa State Daily – Ames
 The Northern Iowan – Cedar Falls
 The Scarlet & Black – Grinnell

Agribusiness/business newspapers
 Des Moines Business Record – Des Moines
 Iowa Farm Bureau Spokesman – Iowa Falls
 Iowa Farmer Today – Cedar Rapids
 Quad-City Business Journal – Davenport

Weekly and bi-weekly community newspapers

Adair County
 Adair County Free Press – Greenfield
 Adair News – Adair
 Fontanelle Observer – Greenfield

Adams County
 Adams County Free Press – Corning

Allamakee County
Allamakee Journal – Lansing
Postville Herald – Postville
Waukon Standard – Waukon

Appanoose County
Moravia Union – Moravia
Moulton Tribune – Moulton

Audubon County
Audubon County Advocate Journal – Audubon

Benton County
 Star Press-Union – Belle Plaine
 Vinton Eagle / Cedar Valley Times – Vinton

Black Hawk County
 Hudson Herald – Hudson
 The Progress-Review – La Porte City

Boone County
 Madrid Register-News – Madrid
 Ogden Reporter – Ogden

Bremer County
Sumner Gazette – Sumner
Tripoli Leader – Tripoli
Waverly Democrat – Waverly

Buchanan County
 Independence Bulletin-Journal – Independence
 Jesup Citizen Herald – Jesup
 Lamont Leader – Lamont
 The Winthrop News – Winthrop

Buena Vista County
 Buena Vista County Journal – Newell, Iowa
 Storm Lake Pilot-Tribune – Storm Lake
 Storm Lake Times – Storm Lake

Butler County
 Butler County Tribune-Journal – Allison
 Clarksville Star – Clarksville

Calhoun County
 Calhoun County Journal – Manson
 Lake City Graphic-Advocate – Lake City

Carroll County
 Breda News – Breda
 Coon Rapids Enterprise – Coon Rapids
 Glidden Graphic – Glidden
 Manning Monitor – Manning

Cass County
 Anita Tribune – Anita
 Griswold American – Griswold

Cedar County
 Lowden Sun-News and Advertiser – Lowden
 Tipton Conservative – Tipton
 West Branch Times – West Branch

Cerro Gordo County
Mirror Reporter – Clear Lake
Pioneer Enterprise – Rockwell

Cherokee County
 Aurelia Star – Aurelia
Cherokee Chronicle Times – Cherokee

Chickasaw County
Fredericksburg News – Fredericksburg
Nashua Reporter – Nashua
New Hampton Economist-Tribune – New Hampton

Clarke County
 Sentinel Tribune – Osceola

Clay County
 Everly-Royal News – Everly
 Peterson Patriot – Peterson
 Sioux Rapids Bulletin-Press – Sioux Rapids

Clayton County
Clayton County Register – Elkader
Guttenberg Press – Guttenberg
Monona Outlook – Monona
North Iowa Times – McGregor
Strawberry Point Press-Journal – Strawberry Point

Clinton County
 The Observer – De Witt

Crawford County
 Charter Oak-Ute Newspaper – Charter Oak
 Denison Bulletin-Review – Denison
 Manilla Times – Manilla
 Schleswig Leader – Schleswig
 Westside Observer – Westside

Dallas County
 Dallas County News – Adel
 Northeast Dallas County Record – Woodward
 Perry Chief – Perry

Davis County
 Bloomfield Democrat – Bloomfield

Decatur County
 Lamoni Chronicle – Lamoni
 Leon Journal-Reporter – Leon

Delaware County
 Delaware County Leader – Hopkinton
Edgewood Reminder – Edgewood
 Manchester Press – Manchester

Des Moines County
 Burlington Beacon - Burlington
Des Moines County News – West Burlington
 Mediapolis News – Mediapolis

Dickinson County
 Dickinson County News – Spirit Lake

Dubuque County
 Cascade Pioneer – Cascade
 Dyersville Commercial – Dyersville

Emmet County
Armstrong Journal – Armstrong
Ringsted Dispatch – Armstrong

Fayette County
Elgin Echo – Elgin
Fayette County Union – West Union
Fayette Leader – Fayette
Hawkeye Booster – Hawkeye

Floyd County
 Rockford Register – Nora Springs

Franklin County
 Conservative Chronicle – Hampton
 Hampton Chronicle – Hampton
 Sheffield Press - Sheffield

Fremont County
 Argus-Herald – Sidney
 Beacon-Enterprise – Tabor
 Hamburg Reporter – Hamburg

Greene County
 Jefferson Herald – Jefferson
 Scranton Journal – Scranton

Grundy County
 The Grundy Register – Grundy Center
 The Record – Conrad
 Reinbeck Courier – Reinbeck

Guthrie County
 Bayard News Gazette – Bayard
 Guthrie Center Times – Guthrie Center
 Guthrie County Vedette – Panora
 Stuart Herald – Stuart

Hamilton County
 South Hamilton Record-News – Jewell
 Stratford Courier – Stratford

Hancock County
 Britt News-Tribune – Forest City
 The Leader – Garner

Hardin County
 Ackley World Journal – Ackley
 Eldora Herald-Ledger – Eldora
 Hardin County Index – Eldora
 Iowa Falls Times Citizen – Iowa Falls
 South Hardin Signal-Review – Hubbard

Harrison County
 Dunlap Reporter – Dunlap
 Missouri Valley Times-News – Missouri Valley
 Twiner-Herald – Woodbine and Logan

Henry County
 New London Journal – New London
 Winfield Beacon/Wayland News – Winfield

Howard County
 Cresco Times-Plain Dealer – Cresco
 Lime Springs Herald – Lime Springs
 Riceville Recorder – Riceville

Humboldt County
 Humboldt Independent – Humboldt

Ida County
 Ida County Courier – Ida Grove

Iowa County
 Hometown Current – Marengo (consolidation and rebranding of the former North English English Valleys Star and Victor Warrior Tribune newspapers in June 2019)
 Marengo Pioneer-Republican – Marengo
 Williamsburg Journal Tribune – Williamsburg

Jackson County
 Bellevue Herald-Leader – Bellevue
 Maquoketa Sentinel-Press Maquoketa
 Preston Times – Preston

Jasper County
 Colfax Jasper Co. Tribune – Colfax
 Monroe Legacy – Monroe
 Prairie City News – Prairie City
 Sully Hometown Press – Sully

Jefferson County
 Packwood Clarion-Plainsman – Richland

Johnson County
 Lone Tree Reporter – Lone Tree
 North Liberty Leader – North Liberty
 Solon Economist – Solon

Jones County
 Anamosa Journal-Eureka – Anamosa
 Midland Times – Wyoming
 Monticello Express – Monticello

Keokuk County
 Keota Eagle – Keota
 Sigourney News-Review – Sigourney
 What Cheer Patriot Chronicle – What Cheer

Kossuth County
 Bancroft Register – Bancroft
 Swea City Herald-Press – Swea City
 Titonka Topic – Titonka
 Upper Des Moines – Algona
 Whittemore Independent – Whittemore

Lee County
 West Point Bee-Star – West Point

Linn County
 Linn News-Letter – Central City
 Marion Times – Marion
 Mount Vernon-Lisbon Sun – Mount Vernon

Louisa County
 Columbus Junction Gazette – Columbus Junction
 Morning Sun News-Herald – Morning Sun
 Wapello Republican – Wapello

Lucas County
 Chariton Herald-Patriot – Chariton
 Chariton Leader – Chariton

Lyon County
 Doon Press – Doon
 The Free Lance – Little Rock
 Lyon County News – George
 Lyon County Reporter – Rock Rapids
 West Lyon Herald – Inwood

Madison County
Earlham Advocate – Earlham
Winterset Madisonian – Winterset
 Earlham Echo – Earlham

Mahaska County
Fremont Village Vine – Fremont
Oskaloosa Herald – Oskaloosa

Marion County
Knoxville Journal-Express – Knoxville
Marion County News – Pleasantville

Marshall County
 Mid Iowa Enterprise – – State Center

Mills County
Glenwood Opinion Tribune – Glenwood
Malvern Leader – Malvern

Mitchell County
Mitchell County Press-News – Osage
Saint Ansgar Enterprise Journal – Saint Ansgar
Stacyville Monitor Review – Stacyville

Monona County
 Mapleton Press – Mapleton
 Onawa Democrat – Onawa
 Onana Sentinel – Onawa

Monroe County
Albia Union-Republican – Albia
Monroe County News – Albia

Montgomery County
 Red Oak Express – Red Oak
 Villisca Review and Stanton Viking – Villisca

Muscatine County
Discover Muscatine – Muscatine
 West Liberty Index – West Liberty
 Wilton-Durant Advocate News – Wilton

O'Brien County
Hartley Sentinel-News – Hartley
 The N'West Iowa Review / Sheldon Mail-Sun – Sheldon
The O'Brien County Bell – Primghar
The Paullina Times – Paullina
Sanborn Pioneer – Sanborn

Osceola County
Melvin News – Melvin
Ocheyedan Press – Ocheyedan
Sibley Gazette-Tribune – Sibley

Page County
Clarinda Herald-Journal – Clarinda
Essex Independent – Essex
Shenandoah Valley News – Shenandoah

Palo Alto County
Emmetsburg Democrat / Emmetsburg Reporter – Emmetsburg
Graettinger Times – Graettinger
Ruthven Zipcode – Ruthven
West Bend Journal – West Bend

Plymouth County
Akron Hometowner – Akron
Hinton Times – Hinton
Kingsley News-Times – Kingsley
Remsen Bell-Enterprise – Remsen

Pocahontas County
Laurens Sun – Laurens
Pocahontas Record Democrat – Pocahontas

Polk County
 Altoona Herald-Mitchellville Index – Altoona
 Cityview – Johnston

Pottawattamie County
 Avoca Journal-Herald – Avoca

Poweshiek County
 Grinnell Herald-Register – Grinnell
 Poweshiek County Chronicle-Republican – Grinnell
 Montezuma Record - Montezuma

Ringgold County
Diagonal Progress – Diagonal
Mount Ayr Record-News – Mount Ayr

Sac County
 Odebolt Chronicle – Odebolt
 The Resort – Lake View
 The Sun – Sac City

Scott County
 Bettendorf News – Bettendorf
 The Catholic Messenger – Davenport
 The North Scott Press – Eldridge

Shelby County
 Harlan Tribune & News Advertiser – Harlan

Sioux County
Hawarden Independent – Hawarden
Ireton Examiner – Ireton
Rock Valley Bee – Rock Valley
Sioux Center News – Sioux Center
Sioux County Capital Democrat – Orange City
Sioux County Index Reporter – Hull
Siouxland Press – Hospers

Story County
 Nevada Journal – Nevada
 Story City Herald – Story City
 Tri-County Times – Slater

Tama County
 Dysart Reporter – Dysart
 Northern-Sun Print – Gladbrook
 Toledo Chronicle – Tama
 Traer Star-Clipper – Traer

Taylor County
 Bedford Times-Press – Bedford
 Lenox Time Table – Lenox

Union County
Star Enterprise – Afton

Van Buren County
Van Buren County Leader-Record Farmington
Van Buren County Register Keosauqua

Wapello County

Warren County
 Carlisle Citizen – Carlisle
 Indianola Independent Advocate – Indianola
 Indianola Record-Herald & Tribune – Indianola
 North Warren Town & County News – Norwalk

Washington County
 Kalona News – Kalona
 Riverside Current – Riverside
 Washington Evening Journal – Washington
 Wellman Advance – Wellman

Wayne County
Corydon Times-Republican – Corydon
Seymour Herald – Seymour

Webster County
 Dayton Leader – Dayton
 Gowrie News – Gowrie

Winnebago County
 Buffalo Center Tribune – Buffalo Center
 Thompson Courier and Rake Register – Thompson

Winneshiek County
Calmar Courier – Calmar
Decorah Journal-Public Opinion – Decorah
Ossian Bee – Ossian

Woodbury County
Danbury Review – Danbury
Moville Record – Moville
Sergeant Bluff Advocate – Sergeant Bluff
Sioux Valley News – Anthon

Worth County
Northwood Anchor Northwood

Wright County
 Belmond Independent – Belmond
 Eagle Grove Eagle – Eagle Grove
 Wright County Monitor – Clarion

Defunct newspapers
 Daily Iowegian – Centerville
 Decorah Posten
 Des Moines Tribune
 Iowa Bystander – Des Moines
 Tama News-Herald – Tama
 The Iowa Jewish News

See also

References

External links
 Iowa Newspaper Association
 . (Survey of local news existence and ownership in 21st century)